An acequia is a community-operated watercourse used for irrigation in Spain and former Spanish colonies.

Acequia may also refer to:

Acequia, Colorado, an unincorporated community
Acequia, Idaho, a city
Acequia Park, a park in San Antonio, Texas
Acequia Madre de Valero (San Antonio), an irrigation canal built by the Payaya people at the direction of the Franciscan priests

See also